Clarence High School is a government co-educational comprehensive junior secondary school located in , a suburb of Hobart, Tasmania, Australia. Established in 1959, the school caters for approximately 600 students from Years 7 to 10. The school is administered by the Tasmanian Department of Education.

In 2021 student enrolments were 603. The school principal is Alanna Green.

History and facilities
The school was the first comprehensive state secondary school on the eastern shore of Hobart's River Derwent, opening in 1959.

The school contains a gymnasium, cricket nets, Australian rules football oval, soccer field and a beach volleyball court.

Clarence High School has four houses; Flynn, Gilmore, Mawson, and Nightingale.

Other
Metro Tasmania operates several bus lines that run past the school, with some bus lines running into and out from the school grounds.

See also 
 List of schools in Tasmania
 Education in Tasmania

References

External links 
 

Public high schools in Hobart
Educational institutions established in 1959
1959 establishments in Australia